Ashg may refer to:

Ashk, Iran (also Ashg and Eshk), a village in South Khorasan Province, Iran
ASHG, the acronym for the American Society of Human Genetics